The South East LHIN was one of fourteen Local Health Integration Networks (LHINs) in the Canadian province of Ontario. In 2021, the legacy functions of LHINs were assigned to Ontario Health and the name South East Local Health Integration Network changed to Home and Community Care Support Services South East.

The South East Local Health Integration Network was a community-based, non-profit organization funded by the Government of Ontario through the Ministry of Health and Long-Term Care.

Services
South East LHIN planned, funded and coordinated the following operational public health care services to a population of approximately for 497,000 people in 2013 (3.7 per cent of the population of Ontario):

 Hospitals - Public General Hospital:
 Kingston General Hospital 
 Hotel Dieu Hospital (Kingston, Ontario) 
 Providence Continuing Care Centre (PCCC)
 Lennox and Addington County General Hospital
 Brockville General Hospital 
 Perth and Smiths Falls Hospital 
 Quinte Healthcare: Belleville, Prince Edward County, Trenton,  North Hastings hospitals 
 Long-Term Care Homes
 South East LHIN Home and Community Care
 Community Support Service Agencies
 Mental Health and Addiction Agencies
 Community Health Centres (CHCs)

Geographic area
South East LHIN provided services for:

 cities of: 
 Kingston
 Belleville
 Brockville
 towns of: 
 Smiths Falls
 Prescott
 areas of: 
 Hastings
 Prince Edward
 Lennox and Addington 
 Frontenac
 Leeds and Grenville Counties, 
 parts of Lanark and Northumberland Counties

Budget
The South East LHIN had an annual budget of 1,051,759,886

References

Health regions of Ontario